Radojičić is a Serbo-Croatian surname. Notable people with the surname include:

Dragan Radojičić (born 1970), Montenegrin football manager and former player
Gabrijel Radojičić (born 1973), former French-born Serbian footballer
Igor Radojičić (born 1966), former President of the National Assembly of Republika Srpska
Milan Radojičić (born 1970), former Serbian footballer
Marija Radojičić (born 1992), Serbian footballer
Nikola Radojičić (born 1992), Serbian footballer
Nikola Radojičić (basketball) (born 1986), Serbian basketballer
Nina Radojičić (born 1989), Serbian singer
Radojica Radojičić (born ?), Croatian football manager
Petar Radojičić (born 1994), Serbian basketballer

Serbian surnames
Patronymic surnames
Montenegrin surnames